Aglummyia is a genus of flies in the family Tachinidae. It contains only one species, Aglummyia percinerea.

References

Dexiinae
Monotypic Diptera genera
Tachinidae genera
Taxa named by Charles Henry Tyler Townsend